is a subway station on the Toei Oedo Line in Shinjuku, Tokyo, Japan, operated by the Tokyo subway operator Tokyo Metropolitan Bureau of Transportation (Toei). It is numbered "E-04".

Lines

Station layout
The station consists of an underground island platform on the third basement ("B3F") level serving two tracks. The ticket machines and barriers are located on the first basement ("B1F") level.

Platforms

History
Ushigome-yanagichō Station opened on 12 December 2000.

Passenger statistics
In fiscal 2011, the station was used by an average of 18,531 passengers daily.

References

External links

  

Stations of Tokyo Metropolitan Bureau of Transportation
Railway stations in Tokyo
Railway stations in Japan opened in 2000